A list of people, who died during the 13th century, who have received recognition as Blessed (through beatification) or Saint (through canonization) from the Catholic Church:

See also 

Christianity in the 13th century

13
 Venerated
 Christian saints
Lists of 13th-century people